Dragoslavele is a commune in the northern part of Argeș County, Muntenia, Romania, located by the former border between Wallachia and Transylvania, on the Wallachian side. It is a relatively important location for boarding house tourism. The commune is composed of two villages, Dragoslavele and Valea Hotarului.

The commune lies at the bottom of the Southern Carpathians' slopes (at one end of the Bran Pass, the narrow valley separating the Piatra Craiului and Bucegi ranges), on the banks of the Dâmbovița River.

History
From the Middle Ages until 1916, Dragoslavele was an important border crossing point between Wallachia (later Romania) and the Habsburg lands (from 1867, Austria-Hungary). During World War I, in October 1916, the area between Dragoslavele and Mateiaș was the scene of a particularly violent battle between Romanian Army and German Army forces (see Romania during World War I).

Natives
 Gheorghe Butoiu

References

Communes in Argeș County
Localities in Muntenia